Rajgram Vivekananda Hindu Vidyalay is a co-ed school located in Bankura city in West Bengal, India. It is affiliated with the West Bengal Board of Secondary Education.

Affiliation
The school is affiliated with the West Bengal Board of Secondary Education.

See also
Bankura Zilla School

References

High schools and secondary schools in West Bengal
Schools in Bankura district
1940 establishments in India
Educational institutions established in 1940